Andreas Christodoulou may refer to:
 Andreas Christodoulou (footballer, born 1934)
 Andreas Christodoulou (footballer, born 1997)
 Antreas Christodoulou, or Andreas, basketball player